Bethel is an unincorporated community in Anderson County, Tennessee.

Bethel is between Clinton and Norris along Tennessee State Route 61.

The Museum of Appalachia is in Bethel.

References

Unincorporated communities in Anderson County, Tennessee
Unincorporated communities in Tennessee